Jean Tarride (1901–1980) was a French actor and film director. He was the brother of the actor Jacques Tarride.

Selected filmography
Director
  (1931)
  (1932)
 The Yellow Dog (1932)
 Étienne (1933)
 The Voyage of Mr. Perrichon (1934)
 Tovaritch (1935)

Bibliography
 Conway, Kelley. Chanteuse in the City: The Realist Singer in French Film. University of California Press, 2004.
 Oscherwitz, Dayna & Higgins, MaryEllen. The A to Z of French Cinema. Scarecrow Press, 2009.

External links

1901 births
1980 deaths
Film directors from Paris